The House of Chavchavadze is a Georgian noble family, formerly a princely one (tavadi), later incorporated into the Russian nobility, also with the title of Prince.

History 
The family is first attested in the 15th century, during the reign of Alexander I of Georgia. By the time of Leon of Kakheti they appear in the province of Kakheti (1529, according to Prince Ioann of Georgia), where they produced two lines: one in Telavi and Tsinandali; another in Qvareli and Shildi. Both these lines were elevated to a princely dignity under the kings Erekle I (1680s) and Constantine II (1726), respectively.

The Chavchavadze family, with its head Prince Garsevan, came to much prominence under the king Erekle II later in the 18th century, and continued to play an important role in Georgia during the Imperial Russian rule. They were confirmed in their rank by the Tsar’s decrees of 1825, 1828, 1829, and 1850.

On 4 July 1853, a small party under Ghazi Muhammad (the son of Murid leader, Imam Shamil) kidnapped Prince Chavchavadze's wife Anna and his sister-in-law, Princess Varvara Orbeliani, together with their children and some others. The princess was exchanged for Shamil's son, Jamalu'd-din and 40,000 roubles on 10 March 1855.

Notable members 

Garsevan Chavchavadze
Alexander Chavchavadze
Nino Chavchavadze
Ilia Chavchavadze
David Chavchavadze
Princess Nina Georgievna of Russia

References 

Bagrationi, Ioane (1768–1830). Chavchavadze (Princes of Kakheti). The Brief Description of the Georgian Noble Houses. Retrieved on December 20, 2007.
Toumanoff, Cyril (1967). Studies in Christian Caucasian History, p. 270. Georgetown University Press.

Noble families of Georgia (country)
Russian noble families
Georgian-language surnames